Nemo 33 is an indoor non-chlorinated fresh water facility in Brussels, Belgium. It held the Guinness World Record as the deepest indoor swimming pool in the world between its opening on 1 May 2004, and the completion of "Y-40 The Deep Joy" at Hotel Terme Millepini in Montegrotto Terme, Padua, Italy on 5 June 2014.

Due to the warm temperature in the pool, divers can dive for extended periods without a dry suit. The complex was designed by Belgian diving expert John Beernaerts as a multipurpose diving instruction, recreational, and film production facility in 2004. Popular Mechanics rates Nemo 33 as one of the top eighteen strangest pools in the world.

Safety
The facility allows tourists, amateur divers, and professional divers. It requires that divers be at least 12 years of age and in good health. All divers must be either certified or supervised by a trainer. All divers must have a certified diver as a dive buddy.

Features
The facility contains a restaurant, bookshop, swimwear store, souvenir store, and rooms for other water activities. There are numerous underwater windows that allow outside visitors and spectators to look into the pools at various depths. It also offers tours around the city of Brussels. 

Nemo 33 is now stands as one of the deepest swimming pools in the world, exceeded by Y-40 The Deep Joy in Italy, Deepspot in Poland, and Deep Dive Dubai in the United Arab Emirates.

See also

 Blue Abyss
 Deep Dive Dubai
 Deepspot
 Y-40

References

External links

 
 Diving to Nemo 33 – Deepest Indoor Pool in the World (Youtube Video)

Sports venues in Brussels
Swimming pools
Swimming venues in Belgium
Uccle
Underwater diving sites in Belgium
2004 establishments in Belgium